
The following is a list of episodes of Wait Wait... Don't Tell Me!, NPR's news panel game, that aired during 2021.  All episodes, unless otherwise indicated, feature host Peter Sagal and announcer/scorekeeper Bill Kurtis, and are produced through the facilities of Wait Wait co-producer WBEZ/Chicago (participants join the show through remote links).  Dates indicated are the episodes' original Saturday air dates.  Job titles and backgrounds of the guests reflect their status at the time of their appearance.

January

February

March

April

May

June

July

August
{| class="wikitable"
|- bgcolor="#CCCCCC"
! style="background:#871E00;color:#FFFFFF;"|Date !! style="background:#871E00;color:#FFFFFF;"|Guest !! style="background:#871E00;color:#FFFFFF;"|Panelists !! style="background:#871E00;color:#FFFFFF;"|Notes
|-
|style="background:#FDD6CC;color:#000000;"|August 7||Larry Krasner, district attorney of Philadelphia||Alonzo Bodden, Mo Rocca, Dulcé Sloan||Show recorded in Philadelphia, Pennsylvania, Wait Wait'''s first show before a live audience since March 2020
|-
|style="background:#FDD6CC;color:#000000;"|August 14||colspan=3|"Best of" episode featuring actors Zach Galifianakis & Charlie Day and soccer star Kristine Lilly
|-
|style="background:#FDD6CC;color:#000000;"|August 21||colspan=3|"Relaxing" best-of episode featuring Singer/songwriter Phoebe Bridgers, survival skills expert Jordan Jonas, animated filmmaker Jennifer Lee, and actor Owen Wilson
|-
|style="background:#FDD6CC;color:#000000;"|August 28||Actress Jane Kaczmarek||Josh Gondelman, Maz Jobrani, Paula Poundstone||Show recorded in Lenox, MA Guest announcer/scorekeeper Chioke I'Anson
|}

September

October

November

December

 References 

External links
Wait Wait... Don't Tell Me! official website
WWDT.me, an unofficial Wait Wait'' historical site

Wait Wait Don't Tell Me
Wait Wait... Don't Tell Me!
Wait Wait Don't Tell Me